The 2011 Netball Superleague Grand Final featured Hertfordshire Mavericks and Surrey Storm. Mavericks would win their second title. This was Mavericks sixth successive grand final while Surrey Storm's were making their debut appearance. Between 2011 and 2016 Surrey Storm would play in five out of the six Netball Superleague grand finals. However in their first three they finished as runners up. In 2011 they lost 57–46 to Mavericks.

Route to the Final

Match summary

Teams

References

2011 Netball Superleague season
2011
Surrey Storm matches
Mavericks Netball matches
Netball Superleague